Balmoral is an unincorporated community in the town of Eagle, Richland County, Wisconsin, United States. Before being called Balmoral, it was originally named Rodolf's Mill and was later known as Lawson before a post office with the name Balmoral opened in 1889.

Notes

Unincorporated communities in Richland County, Wisconsin
Unincorporated communities in Wisconsin